The former administrative units of Pakistan are states, provinces and territories which mainly existed between 1947 and 1975 when the current provinces and territories were established. The former units have no administrative function today but some remain as historical and cultural legacies. In some cases, the current provinces and territories correspond to the former units – for example the province of Punjab includes almost all the territory of the former province of West Punjab.

At independence

(i) Provinces of Pakistan

(ii) Federal Capital Territory of Pakistan

(iii) Princely States of Pakistan

Between August 1947 and March 1948, the rulers of the following princely states (which had existed alongside but outside British India) acceded their states to Pakistan, giving up control of their external affairs, while all retaining internal self-government, at least to begin with. This was lost by stages, until by 1974 all of the states had been fully integrated into Pakistan.
 Bahawalpur
 Khairpur
 Kalat
 Las Bela
 Kharan
 Makran
 Phulra
 Amb
 Swat
 Dir
 Chitral
 Hunza
 Nagar
 Gilgit Agency (after getting independence)

After independence
The origins of most of the former administrative units lay in the set-up inherited from British India. From 1947 to 2018 newly independent Pakistan comprised two "wings" – 1600 kilometres apart and separated by India. The eastern wing comprised the single province of East Bengal, which included the Sylhet District from the former British Indian province of Assam as well as the Buddhist-majority Chittagong Hill Tracts awarded by the Radcliffe Commission. The politically dominant western wing united three Governor's provinces (North-West Frontier Province (NWFP), West Punjab and Sind), and one Chief Commissioner's Province (Baluchistan), also included were thirteen princely states and parts of Kashmir.

In 1948, the area around Karachi was separated from Sind province to form the Federal Capital Territory. In 1950 the North-West Frontier Province was expanded to include the small states of Amb and Phulra and the name of West Punjab province was changed to Punjab. The Baluchistan States Union was formed in 1952 by the four princely states of southwest Pakistan. Thus, between 1947 and 1955, Pakistan comprised five provinces and one territory.

The western wing eventually included  thirteen princely states, one union of states, Gwadar enclave, Gilgit agency and parts of Kashmir:

 Gilgit Agency (former agency of Kashmir – after independence on 1 November 1947, using flag of Muslim League)
 Azad Jammu and Kashmir (after Kashmir War 1947~48 - using newly AJK Flag )
 Baluchistan States Union (combining Kalat, Kharan, Las Bela and Makran in 1953 – using flag of Kalat)
 Gwadar Enclave (purchased from Sultanate of Oman in 1958)

One Unit of Pakistan 1955

Simmering tensions between the eastern and western wings of Pakistan led to the One Unit policy announced by Prime Minister Muhammad Ali Bogra. The states and provinces of the western wing merged in 1955 to become divisions of the new province of West Pakistan with the provincial capital at Lahore. At the same time, East Bengal became the new province of East Pakistan with the provincial capital at Dacca. West Pakistan annexed the former Omani enclave of Gwadar (on the Balochistan coast) in 1958 as part of Kalat division. In 1960 the federal government moved from Karachi to Rawalpindi (the provisional capital pending the completion of Islamabad), whilst the federal legislature moved to Dacca. The Federal Capital Territory was merged with West Pakistan in 1961 to form the new division of Karachi. In 1963 the Trans-Karakoram Tract was transferred by treaty from Gilgit Agency to China under the provision that the settlement was subject to the final solution of the Kashmir dispute. Thus from 1955 to 1970, Pakistan comprised two provinces:

 East Pakistan
 West Pakistan

New provinces of Pakistan 1970

The One Unit policy was regarded as a rational administrative reform to reduce expenditure and eliminate provincial prejudices. However the military coup of 1958 signalled troubled times for the two-province system as the office of Chief Minister of West Pakistan was abolished by President Ayub Khan to be replaced by Governor's rule. Eventually, in 1970, the province of West Pakistan was dissolved by President Yahya Khan and four new provinces were created along with some changes in Pakistani Kashmir. These provinces combined most of the former provinces and states as follows:

Changes after 1970
The province of East Pakistan became independent on December 16, 1971, as the new country of Bangladesh. The states of Hunza and Nagar were abolished and their territories merged into the Northern Areas in 1974. The Federally Administered Tribal Areas were formed from parts of the North West Frontier Province districts of Peshawar and Dera Ismail Khan in 1975.

The status of the Islamabad area was changed to a capital territory in 1981. The names of two provinces were slightly modified in 1990 – Baluchistan became Balochistan and Sind became Sindh. In 2009, the Northern Areas changed its name to Gilgit–Baltistan. In 2010, the North West Frontier Province changed its name to Khyber Pakhtunkhwa. 8 Years later in May 2018, the Federally Administered Tribal Areas merged with Khyber Pakhtunkhwa.

See also
Junagadh State - Acceded to Pakistan
Hyderabad State - Supported by Pakistan
Administrative units of Pakistan
Politics of Pakistan 
Divisions of Pakistan 
Jammu and Kashmir (Princely State)

External links
Government of Pakistan

Political history of Pakistan